Raymond Gafford (January 22, 1914 – February 20, 1990) was an American professional golfer. 

Gafford was born in Coleman, Texas. He worked as a club professional at Ridglea Country Club in Fort Worth, Texas from 1937 to 1950 and again from 1954 until his retirement. He worked at Northwood Club in Dallas from 1950 to 1954.

Gafford won the 1946 Oklahoma Open, was a quarterfinalist at the 1950 PGA Championship, and was the first round leader at the 1952 Masters Tournament.

Gafford was inducted into the Texas Golf Hall of Fame in 1983.

Professional wins
this list may be incomplete
1943 Southwest Open
1944 Southwest Open
1946 Oklahoma Open
1949 Texas PGA

Results in major championships

Note: Gafford never played in The Open Championship.

NT = No tournament
WD = Withdrew
CUT = missed the half-way cut
R64, R32, R16, QF, SF = Round in which player lost in PGA Championship match play
"T" indicates a tie for a place

References

American male golfers
American golf instructors
Golfers from Texas
People from Coleman, Texas
1914 births
1990 deaths